Blood Sports is a 1984 album released by the British heavy metal band Avenger. It was reissued in 2002 by Frontline Records.

Track listing 
Side one
 "Enforcer" (Mick Moore, Ian Davison Swift) - 3:52
 "You'll Never Take Me (Alive)" (Les Cheetam, Moore, Swift, Gary Young)  - 3:22
 "Matriarch" (Bob James, Ronnie Montrose, Jim Alcivar, Alan Fitzgerald, Denny Carmassi) - 3:51 (Montrose cover)
 "Warfare" (Moore, Swift, Young) - 5:26

Side two
 "On the Rocks" (Moore, Young, Brian Ross, Steve Bird) - 2:50
 "Rough Ride" (Moore, Swift) - 3:28
 "Victims of Force" (Moore, Swift) - 3:30
 "Death Race 2000" (Moore, Young) - 3:06
 "N.O.T.J." (Moore, Swift) - 5:32

Personnel 
Avenger
 Ian Davison Swift - lead vocals
 Les Cheetham - guitars
 Mick Moore - bass guitar
 Gary Young - drums

Production
Martin Smith - producer, engineer

References 

1984 albums
New Wave of British Heavy Metal albums